The Northern Mariana Islands, together with Guam to the south, compose the Mariana Islands. The southern islands are limestone, with level terraces and fringing coral reefs. The northern islands are volcanic, with active volcanoes on Anatahan, Pagan and Agrihan. About one-fifth of the land is arable; another tenth is pasture. The primary natural resource is fish, some of which are endangered species, which leads to conflict. Also, development has created landfills which have contaminated the groundwater on Saipan, which could lead to disease.

Anatahan began erupting suddenly from its east crater on May 10, 2003, at about 6 p.m. local time (08:00 UTC). It has since alternated between eruptive and calm periods.

Climate
The islands have a tropical marine climate moderated by seasonal northeast trade winds. There is little seasonal temperature variation. The dry season runs from December to June, and the rainy season from July to November and can include typhoons. The Guinness Book of World Records has cited Saipan as having the most equable climate in the world.

See also
Extreme points of the Northern Mariana Islands

References

 
Northern Mariana Islands
Northern Mariana